Vilavur is a panchayat town in Kanniyakumari district in the Indian state of Tamil Nadu.Nearest Airport Thiruvananthapuram(KERALA)

Demographics
 India census, Vilavur had a population of 13,373. Males constitute 48% of the population and females 52%. Vilavur has an average literacy rate of 79%, higher than the national average of 59.5%: male literacy is 83%, and female literacy is 76%. In Vilavur, 11% of the population is under 6 years of age.

References

Cities and towns in Kanyakumari district